Jeffrey Victor Watson (born November 5, 1956 in Sacramento, California) is an American guitarist originally known as one of the founding members and lead guitarist of the band Night Ranger, in which he has played as co-guitarist with guitarist Brad Gillis. Watson developed his signature eight-fingered tapping technique during his time in the band.

He appeared as a special guest on Douglas Docker's Docker's Guild project. Watson has also released solo albums. In 2007, he was fired by the three other members of Night Ranger through a letter from their attorney. During 2009 Jeff was part of Dennis DeYoung's travelling band.

Discography

Solo albums
Lone Ranger (1992)
Around the Sun (1993)

with Night Ranger
Dawn Patrol (1982)
Midnight Madness (1983)
7 Wishes (1985)
Big Life (1987)
Man in Motion (1988)
Neverland (1997)
Seven (1998)
Hole in the Sun (2007)

with Mother's Army
Mother's Army (1993)
Planet Earth (1997)
Fire on the Moon (1998)

Guest appearances

Instructional
In 1986, Jeff released an instructional guitar video titled Jeff Watson: Star Licks Master Series, for Star Licks Productions.

References

Further reading

External links 

1956 births
Night Ranger members
Living people
American heavy metal guitarists
Lead guitarists
American male guitarists
20th-century American guitarists
20th-century American male musicians
Mother's Army members